Albert de Bailliencourt (30 March 1908, Neuilly-sur-Seine - 28 May 1994) was a French politician. He represented the Radical Party in the National Assembly from 1956 to 1958.

References
 http://www.assemblee-nationale.fr/sycomore/

1908 births
1994 deaths
People from Neuilly-sur-Seine
Politicians from Île-de-France
Radical Party (France) politicians
Deputies of the 3rd National Assembly of the French Fourth Republic